Benhill is a council housing estate in Sutton, London, originally built in the 1960s upon woodland. It is east of Sutton High Street. The estate was later renovated and regenerated.

The wider surrounding area whose initial development of large villas dates from Victorian times was intended for the upper middle class, whereas nearby Newtown - built around the same time as Benhill - was intended for the lower class. Construction began in 1852. However, development of it was slow and by 1913 there were still many empty building plots.

One of its residents, Gerard 'Jed' Edge, had a picture of him selected as part of the 2009 BP Portrait Award exhibition and supplied snakes for the Steven Spielberg film Raiders of the Lost Ark. He died on 11 April 2013 after his flat in Benhill Wood Road caught fire.

References

Districts of the London Borough of Sutton
Housing estates in the London Borough of Sutton